Hard Country is the ninth album by American singer-songwriter Michael Martin Murphey and his first soundtrack album. The 1981 film Hard Country stars Jan-Michael Vincent and Kim Basinger.

Track listing
 "Cowboy Cadillac" (Murphey) by Michael Martin Murphey– 4:04
 "Hard Country" (Murphey) by Michael Martin Murphey – 4:04
 "Hard Partyin' Country Darlin'" (Murphey) by Michael Martin Murphey – 3:02
 "Texas (When I Die)" (Bobby Borchers, Ed Bruce, Patsy Bruce) by Tanya Tucker – 4:48
 "Cosmic Cowboy/Cowboy Breakdown" (Murphey) by Michael Martin Murphey – 3:50
 "Break My Mind" (John D. Loudermilk) by Michael Martin Murphey – 2:18
 "Take It As It Comes" (Murphey) by Michael Martin Murphey – 3:04
 "Somebody Must Have Loved You Right Last Night" (Bell) by Tanya Tucker – 3:28
 "I'm Gonna Love You Anyway" (Martine) by Tanya Tucker – 2:01
 "I Love You So Much It Hurts" (Tillman) by Jerry Lee Lewis – 2:18
 "West Texas Waltz" (Hancock) by Joe Ely – 4:57

Credits
Music
 Michael Martin Murphey – vocals, guitar, piano, harmonica
 Tanya Tucker – vocals
 Joe Ely – vocals
 Jerry Lee Lewis – vocals
 Linda Ronstadt – vocals

Production
 Chip Young – producer (10)
 Jerry Crutchfield – producer (8)
 Jerry Goldstein – producer (3)
 Michael Murphey – producer (1, 2, 4-6)
 Mike Chapman – producer (7)
 Deni King – engineering

References

External links
 Michael Martin Murphey's Official Website

Michael Martin Murphey albums
Drama film soundtracks
1981 soundtrack albums
Epic Records soundtracks